Gavril Pele "Gabi" Balint (born 3 January 1963) is a Romanian football manager and former player, who was part of the hugely successful Steaua team of the 1980s.

Club career
Born in Sângeorz-Băi, Bistrița, Balint made his Divizia A debut with Steaua București in 1981 where he played until 1990 winning the league titles in 1985, 1986, 1987, 1988 and 1989, the Romanian Cup in 1985, 1987 and 1989, the 1985–86 European Cup and the European Super Cup in 1987. At the end of the 1989–90 season, Balint became the top goalscorer of the Divizia A with 19 goals. He scored the second and last goal at the penalties shoot-out during the 1986 European Cup final, helping his team, Steaua to win the trophy.

In 1990, he was bought by Real Burgos for $1,000,000. He played for the Spanish side until his retirement in 1993.

International career
Balint was capped 34 times by Romania, and scored 14 goals. He played at the 1990 World Cup where he scored twice, against Cameroon and Argentina.

International goals
Romania's goal tally first.

Managerial career
Balint started his coaching career in 1994, aged 31, when he was appointed as assistant coach of Romania under Anghel Iordănescu's regime. Four years later comes his first chance as head coach after taking charge at Sportul Studențesc, but in May 2000 he is called again to join the coaching staff of Romania as the squad prepared for the UEFA Euro 2000.

In the summer of 2000, Balint was requested by Mircea Lucescu as his assistant for Galatasaray, however he left the job after only one season, to join again Romania as assistant coach, this time under Gheorghe Hagi.

After Hagi resigned, Balint went to Sheriff Tiraspol for his second job as head coach, taking the team in 2002.

In 2003, he returned to Romania and signed for Sportul Studențesc, now in Liga II and helped the team win promotion back to Liga I.

Balint returned as assistant coach for Galatasaray in 2004 to work again with Gheorghe Hagi.

In 2005, he was appointed assistant coach of FCU Politehnica Timișoara, working again with Hagi. When Hagi left, a few months later, Balint resigned also. Two years later, Balint returned to FC Timișoara, this time as a head coach.

In 2010, he became the head coach of the Moldova national team, but after the campaign for the UEFA Euro 2012, his contract ended and was not renewed. He then became a television pundit, signing a contract with Digi Sport.

In April 2013, Balint returned to coaching, signing a contract for one and a half years with FC Vaslui. In 2014 he was named head coach of Liga II side CS Universitatea Craiova and helped the club win promotion for the top-flight Liga I.

Career statistics 
 Divizia A: 264 games, 69 goals
 La Liga: 83 games, 28 goals
 European Cup: 30 games, 6 goals
 Cup Winners' Cup: 2 games, 0 goals
 Romania national football team: 34 caps, 14 goals

As a manager

Honours

As a player
  Steaua București
 Romanian League:
 Winner: 1984–85, 1985–86, 1986–87, 1987–88, 1988–89
 Runner-up: 1983–84, 1989–90
 Romanian Cup:
 Winner: 1984–85, 1986–87, 1988–89
 Runner-up: 1983–84, 1985–86, 1989–90
 European Cup:
 Winner: 1985–86
 Runner-up: 1988–89
 European Super Cup:
 Winner: 1986
 Intercontinental Cup:
 Runner-up: 1986
 Romania
 FIFA U-20 World Cup: 
 Third-place: 1981

As a manager
  Sheriff Tiraspol
 Divizia Națională:
 Winner: 2002–03
 Moldovan Super Cup:
 Winner: 2003
 CIS Cup
 Winner: 2003

Trivia
 Balint has a passion for music and Harley Davidson. He even produced his own CD.
 He is named Pele because his father was a fan of the three time World Cup winner Pelé.

References

External links
 
 
 
 

1963 births
Living people
People from Sângeorz-Băi
Romanian footballers
Romania international footballers
Romania youth international footballers
FC Steaua București players
Real Burgos CF footballers
1990 FIFA World Cup players
Liga I players
La Liga players
Association football forwards
Romanian football managers
Romanian expatriate football managers
FC Sheriff Tiraspol managers
Moldova national football team managers
FC Politehnica Timișoara managers
FC Bihor Oradea managers
FC Vaslui managers
Romanian expatriate footballers
Expatriate footballers in Spain
Romanian expatriate sportspeople in Spain
Expatriate football managers in Moldova
Expatriate football managers in Turkey
Romanian expatriate sportspeople in Turkey
FC Sportul Studențesc București managers
CS Universitatea Craiova managers
Moldovan Super Liga managers